Bon Pastor is a Barcelona Metro station named after the neighbourhood of the same name where the station is situated, part of Barcelona's district of Sant Andreu. This neighbourhood, one of Barcelona's most deprived areas and until very recently made up mostly of cheap public housing has been undergoing some renovation. The station was opened on 18 April 2010 with the opening of the line from this station to Gorg and Can Peixauet, enabling this neighbourhood to be connected with the metro network. It is served by TMB-operated Barcelona Metro lines L9 and L10.

Layout
The station is located under Sant Adrià street and was built like many other new L9 metro stations with a 16-meter depth and 26 meter diameter well. The station is divided in three levels: the upper hall, the upper platform and the lower platform. The upper hall has an only access from the street equipped with escalators and elevators, making the station accessible for disabled persons. The upper hall has also ticket vending machines and a TMB Control Center. The upper platform is where run the trains towards La Sagrera and the lower platform is where run the trains towards Can Zam and Gorg stations. Until the opening of the line to La Sagrera, the lower platform was closed and all trains travelled on the upper level.

Architecture
The walls of the tunnel where the platforms are located are cladded with cast stone panels with different densities, curves and perforations. The process combines white pre-cast stone with a gentle acid-etched finish and encrusted glass beads that let light filter through. Each platform is equipped  with white cast stone benches with a shiny polished finish rest on cantilevered metal brackets to camouflage the station's air-conditioning outlets. This project was designed by architects A&M in conjunction with Escofet while the architectural design of the station in general was designed by Tomàs Morató.

Gallery

References

External links

 L9 metro station listing at TMB website
 L10 metro station listing at TMB website
 Information and photos about the station at Trenscat.com
 Photo gallery of the metro station at El País

Railway stations in Spain opened in 2010
Transport in Sant Andreu
Barcelona Metro line 9 stations
Barcelona Metro line 10 stations